Nea Krini (literally New Fountain) is an under-construction metro station serving Thessaloniki Metro's Line 2. It is expected to enter service in 2023.

References

See also
List of Thessaloniki Metro stations

Thessaloniki Metro